Guifang was an ancient ethnonym for a northern people that fought against the Shang Dynasty (1600-1046 BCE). Chinese historical tradition identified the Guifang with the Rong, Di, Xunyu, Xianyun, or Xiongnu peoples. This Chinese exonym combines gui (鬼 "ghost, spirit, devil") and fang (方 "side, border, country, region"), a suffix referring to "non-Shang or enemy countries that existed in and beyond the borders of the Shang polity."

Overview
Chinese annals contain a number of references to the Guifang. Earliest sources mentioning the Guifang are the Oracle Bones.<ref name = "Yu106109">Yu Taishan. (2000). "A Hypothesis about the Source of the Sai Tribes"in Sino-Platonic Papers' 106. Ed. Victor Mair. p. 106-109</ref>Anderson, Matthew Mccutchen. (2015). "Change and Standardization in Anyang: Writing and Culture in Bronze Age China". Publicly Accessible Penn Dissertations. 1589. https://repository.upenn.edu/edissertations/1589 p. 106 Extant oracle bones record no military action between Shang and Guifang, yet Guifang have been interpreted as hostile towards Shang or not hostile.

The Bamboo Annals, interred with King Xiang of Wei (died 296 BC) and re-discovered nearly six centuries later in 281 AD (Western Jin dynasty) in the Jizhong discovery, state that:

In the thirty-second year of Shang King Wu Ding (fl. 1200s BCE), he attacked the Guifang, and stationed at Jing (荊); and in the thirty-fourth year, the King's armies subdued the Guifang, and the Di and Qiang came as guests. Wu Ding's conquests against the Guifang are also mentioned in the Yi Jing "Book of Changes".Yijing "䷾既濟 - Ji Ji" quote: "高宗伐鬼方，三年克之" James Legge's translation: "[Gao Zong], who attacked the Demon region, but was three years in subduing it." 
in the thirty-fifth year of the Shang King Wu Yi (i.e. 1119 BCE), Zhou leader Jili attacked the Gǔiróng in Xiluo (西落) and captured twenty Dí kings. Historians believe that the Guirong were identical to the Guifang.

The oracle bones indicate that, following Wu Ding's conquest, the Guifang became Shang's subjects and even assisted the Shang against other polities, e.g. the Qiang. Gui officials even managed to achieve high statuses in the Shang court; for examples, a Gui official, Geng, was ordered to perform the gang sacrifice 剛 in the xiang 亯 sacrificial temple.

Up to the time of Shang king Di Xin, Gui chiefs had been long-enfeoffed vassals of Shang and even participated in the Shang royal government. In Stratagem of the Warring States, Lu Zhonglian (魯仲連) related that Marquis of Gui (鬼侯) ranked among Di Xin's Three Ducal Ministers (along with Marquis of E (鄂侯) and Western Count [Ji] Chang (西伯昌)) and married his beloved daughter to Di Xin. However, Di Xin considered her detestably ugly (惡), so he killed her and boiled alive Marquis of Gui; Marquid of E sharply criticized Di Xin and was butchered. A parallel account in Shiji features Marquis of Jiu (九侯), his daughter (九侯女), and Marquis of E (鄂侯); Marquis of Jiu was identified with Marquis of Gui. Another parallel account in Taiping Yulan states Marquis of Gui's daughter disapproved of Di Xin's debaucheries so Di Xin killed her and her father; and Di Xin had Marquis of Xing butchered instead of Marquis of E..

Among the succeeding Zhou dynasty's bronze inscriptions, the Xiao Yu Ding (小盂鼎) –cast in the twenty-fifth year (976 BCE) of King Kang of Zhou (r. 1005/03–978 BCE)– mentioned the Guifang, probably located northeast of the initial Zhou domain. After two successful battles against the Guifang, the Zhou victors brought captured enemies to the Zhou temple and offered to the king. The prisoners numbered over 13,000 with four chiefs who were subsequently executed. Zhou also captured a large amount of booty. 

As a result of phonetical studies and comparisons based on the inscriptions on bronze and the structure of the characters, Wang Guowei came to the conclusion that the tribal names in the annalistic sources Guifang, Xunyu, Xianyu, Xianyun, Rong, Di, and Hu designated one and the same people, who later entered history under the name Xiongnu.Wang Guowei, "Guantang Jilin" (觀堂集林, Wang Guowei collection of works), Ch.2, Ch. 13

Likewise, using Sima Qian's Records of the Grand Historian and other sources, Vsevolod Taskin proposes that in the earlier pre-historic period (i.e. the time of the legendary Yellow Emperor) the Xiongnu were called Hunyu; and in the late pre-historic period (i.e. the time of the legendary Emperor Yao and Emperor Shun) they were called Rong; in the literate period starting with the Shang dynasty (1600–1046 BC) they were called Guifang, in the Zhou period (1045–256 BC) they were called Xianyun, and starting from the Qin period (221–206 BC) the Chinese annalists called them Xiongnu.in Taskin V.S., "Materials on history of Sünnu", p.10 

Even so, Paul R. Goldin (2011) reconstructs the Old Chinese pronunciations of 葷粥 ~ 獯鬻 ~ 獯鬻 ~ 薰育 as *xur-luk, 獫狁 as hram′-lun′, and 匈奴 as *xoŋ-NA; and comments all three names are "manifestly unrelated". He further states that sound changes made the names more superficially similar than they really had been, and prompted later commentators to conclude that those names must have referred to one same people in different epochs, even though people during the Warring States period would never have been thus misled.

Other fang-countries
The Shang state had a system of writing attested to by bronze inscriptions and oracle bones, which record Shang troops fighting frequent wars with neighboring nomadic herdsmen from the inner Asian steppes. In his oracular divinations, a Shang king repeatedly showed concern about the fang (方, likely meaning "border-region"; the modern term for them is 方国 fāngguó "fang-countries"), groups of barbarians outside his inner tu (土) regions in the center of Shang territory. A particularly hostile tribe, Tufang (:zh:土方) from the Yan Mountains region, is regularly mentioned in divinatory records. Another Chinese ethnonym for the animal husbandry nomads was ma (馬) or "horse" barbarians mentioned at the Shang western military frontier in the Taihang Mountains, where they fought and may have used chariots.

Notes

 References 
 Citations 

 Sources 

 

Further reading
Fang Shiming & Wang Xiuling (1981). 古本竹書紀年輯證 (Old Text Bamboo Annals - Collected Proofs)'' (in Chinese)

See also 
 Ethnic groups in Chinese history

Ancient peoples of China
Shang dynasty
Xiongnu